Firsovsky is a rural locality (a khutor) in Saltynskoye Rural Settlement, Uryupinsky District, Volgograd Oblast, Russia. The population was 187 as of 2010. There are 7 streets.

Geography 
Firsovsky is located in steppe, on the left bank of the Saltynka River, 30 km north of Uryupinsk (the district's administrative centre) by road. Saltynsky is the nearest rural locality.

References 

Rural localities in Uryupinsky District